Haunted Heart is un upcoming Spanish-Colombian thriller film directed by Fernando Trueba from a screenplay by Trueba and Rylend Grant which stars Matt Dillon and Aida Folch alongside Juan Pablo Urrego.

Plot 
Set in remote Greek island, the plot involves Spanish woman Alex entering to work in a seaside restaurant managed by American owner Max (himself with a dark and mysterious past).

Cast

Production 
The screenplay was penned by Fernando Trueba and Rylend Grant. Trueba said that he took inspiration from Patricia Highsmith's novels and Alfred Hitchcock's films. The film is a Fernando Trueba PC, Atlantika Films, and Caracol Inc. production, with the participation of RTVE, Ekome Greece, Caracol Inc., Deloitte Spain and Film Constellation, and support from ICAA and the Madrid regional administration. Shooting locations included Greece.

Release 
Distributed by BTeam Pictures, the film's theatrical release in Spain is tentatively expected for 2023.

See also 
 List of Spanish films of 2023

References 

Upcoming films
Spanish thriller films
Colombian thriller films
Films shot in Greece
Films set in Greece
Films directed by Fernando Trueba
English-language films